Kööchü is a village in the Tüp District of Issyk-Kul Region of Kyrgyzstan. Its population was 2,211 in 2021.

References

Populated places in Issyk-Kul Region